John Clayton VanOrnum (born October 20, 1939, at Pasadena, California) is an American former professional baseball player, manager, coach and scout. From  through , VanOrnum served as the bullpen coach of the San Francisco Giants of Major League Baseball.

Primarily a catcher during his six-year minor league playing career (1959–64), he was a member of the Los Angeles Dodgers and Los Angeles Angels organizations, then managed in the Giants' farm system at the Class A and Double-A levels from 1973–78.

After his term as a Giants' coach under Dave Bristol, Frank Robinson and Danny Ozark, VanOrnum then worked as a Major League and advance scout for the Giants, Dodgers, Angels and Atlanta Braves through .

Early in his playing career, VanOrnum served as the catcher on the 1959–60 television series Home Run Derby, which was filmed at Los Angeles' Wrigley Field.

References

1939 births
Living people
Anaheim Angels scouts
American expatriate baseball players in Mexico
Atlanta Braves scouts
Baseball coaches from California
Baseball players from California
Broncos de Reynosa players
Great Falls Electrics players
Greenville Spinners players
Los Angeles Dodgers scouts
Major League Baseball bullpen coaches
Major League Baseball scouts
Minor league baseball managers
Odessa Dodgers players
People from Pasadena, California
Reno Silver Sox players
San Francisco Giants coaches
San Francisco Giants scouts
San Jose Bees players